Henley High School may refer to:

Henley High School (Adelaide, South Australia)
Henley High School (Klamath Falls, Oregon)